A Gipsy Cavalier is a 1922 British historical drama film directed by J. Stuart Blackton and starring Georges Carpentier, Flora le Breton and Rex McDougall. It was one of three films made in Britain during the early 1920s by the British-born American founder of Vitagraph Studios. All involved elaborate sets, costumes and extras and set an example of showmanship to emerging British filmmakers. It was adapted from the novel My Lady April by John Overton.

Cast
 Georges Carpentier as Valerius Carew 
 Flora le Breton as Dorothy Forrest 
 Rex McDougall as Ralph Carew 
 Mary Clare as Janet 
 Hubert Carter as Bartholomew Griggs 
 William Luff as Beydach 
 Simeon Stuart as Sir Julian Carew 
 W.D.C. Knox as Sir George Forrest 
 Norma Whalley as Lady Forrest 
 Percy Standing as Stirrett 
 Tom Coventry as Ballard 
 Charles Stuart Blackton as Valerius as a Child
 Ursula Jeans as Extra

References

Bibliography

External links

1922 films
British silent feature films
Films directed by J. Stuart Blackton
Films set in England
Films set in the 18th century
1920s historical drama films
British historical drama films
1922 drama films
1920s English-language films
1920s British films
Silent historical drama films